Samuel Hughes Woodson (September 15, 1777 – July 28, 1827) was an American politician who served as a U.S. Representative from Kentucky. He was father of Samuel Hughes Woodson.

Born near Charlottesville, Virginia, Woodson completed preparatory studies. He studied law and was admitted to the bar in 1802 and commenced practice in Nicholasville, Kentucky. He served as clerk of Jessamine County Circuit Court 1803-1819.

Woodson was elected to the 17th Congress (March 4, 1821 – March 3, 1823). He was an unsuccessful candidate for reelection in 1822 to the 18th Congress. He resumed the practice of his profession in Nicholasville. He served as member of the State house of representatives in 1825 and 1826.

Woodson owned slaves.

He died at "Chaumiere," Jessamine County, Kentucky, July 28, 1827. He was interred in the Crocket Burying Ground.

References

1777 births
1827 deaths
Democratic-Republican Party members of the United States House of Representatives from Kentucky
Members of the Kentucky House of Representatives